Fire was the third album by Wild Orchid, which was scheduled to be released on June 19, 2001. This was the group's final release with Stacy Ferguson and with RCA Records.

Production
The album was recorded from 1999 to 2000, with several of the tracks being co-written and co-produced by 'N Sync member JC Chasez, Oliver Leiber, Robbie Nevil, 3AM and Sweden's Epicenter. Stefanie Ridel told Billboard magazine, "The album's lighter, more fun - and more in step with how we feel about ourselves." She also stated that the album would be filled with energy and spirit, in comparison to the group's previous two albums, which she thought were overly serious.

Release and promotion
Promotion for the album began back in 1999 while Wild Orchid was in the midst of recording. They performed "World Without You" and "Candle Light" while opening for Chers Do You Believe? Tour. While opening for 'N Sync's 'N Sync in Concert tour during their winter shows, they performed the title track "Fire." The group  performed "World Without You" on Great Pretenders. "It's All Your Fault" was also featured in the 2000 film What Women Want.

Fire was slated to be released in August 2000 and in support of it, Wild Orchid was due to be the opening act for 'N Sync's No Strings Attached Tour. Unfortunately, Stacy Ferguson became addicted to crystal meth at the time and because of this, the group had to cancel touring plans with 'N Sync and the release date of Fire was pushed back to June 19, 2001.
 
"Stuttering (Don't Say)" was released as the album's lead single on May 8, 2001 and the group toured with other teen-pop acts and performed at clubs and small venues from May to August 2001. The group even had a concert special called Shoutback!, which was taped on April 8, 2001 and broadcast by MuchUSA on July 29, 2001. During the special, the group performed several songs from Fire, as well as from Wild Orchid and Oxygen. Also, radio station KDME in Minneapolis hosted a concert on May 28, 2001 which featured not only Wild Orchid but The Black Eyed Peas as well, which Stacy Ferguson would later become a member of.

Track listing
"Stuttering (Don't Say)" (Alex Cantrall, Sander Selover, Jon Von) - 3:59
"Just Another Girl" (JC Chasez) - 3:37
"Do Me Right" 3:22
"Simon Sez" (Stacy Ferguson, Stefanie Ridel, Renee Sands) - 3:47
"It's All Your Fault" (Robbie Nevil, Joey Schwarz) - 4:04
"World Without You" 4:46
"It's Only Your Love" 3:37
"Fire" (Chasez) - 3:29
"A Little Bit of Lovin'" 4:24
"Candle Light" 4:14
"You Knew" (David Nicoll, Chasez) - 4:02
"One Moment" (Bob DiPiero, Ferguson, Ridel, Sands) - 3:57

B-Sides
"Lies" (Chasez) - 3:34

ChartsSingles''' - Billboard'' (North America)

References

Wild Orchid (group) albums
Unreleased albums